The Sparta Youth Academy is a football youth academy based in Rotterdam, Netherlands, from where the organization manages a total of 13 youth teams (ages 7–18). The academy is the primary youth clinic of Dutch football club Sparta Rotterdam, the oldest professional football club in the Netherlands.

The Academy received the four star academic sports certification, the highest possible rating for sports academies in the Netherlands, having won the best National football academy award on several occasions.

History

The Sparta youth system is famous for having produced and still producing many great Dutch internationals such as: Danny Blind, Danny Koevermans, David Mendes da Silva, Ed de Goey, Winston Bogarde, Henk Fräser, Jan van Beveren, Jetro Willems, John de Wolf, Kevin Strootman, Kew Jaliens, Luuk Balkestein, Pim Doesburg, and Nick Viergever.

Notable former players 

 David Abdul
 Luuk Balkestein
 Jan van Beveren
 Sendley Bito
 Danny Blind
 Winston Bogarde
 Rachid Bouaouzan
 Nourdin Boukhari
 Memphis Depay
 Pim Doesburg
 Lerin Duarte
 Marvin Emnes
 Erik Falkenburg
 Henk Fräser
 Anwar El Ghazi
 Joey Godee
 Ed de Goey
 Kew Jaliens
 Danny Koevermans
 Mimoun Mahi
 James Lawrence
 Marten de Roon
 David Mendes da Silva
 Kevin Strootman
 Nick Viergever
 Marvin Wijks
 Georginio Wijnaldum
 Giliano Wijnaldum
 Jetro Willems
 John de Wolf

Teams

Competition history

Education
In addition to training professional football players, the Sparta Youth Academy also offer other courses, such as a degree in Sports Marketing, in collaboration with the Erasmus University Rotterdam offered since 2011. A level 3 and level 4 International Business Study program in Sport & Exercise has been offered since 2009 in collaboration with Zadkine College. It is specifically for the players who start in the MBO (department sport and physical activity) and the players that follow a different vocational training in collaboration with a Zadkine customization.

Board and staff

Current Staff
Chairman
 Rob Westerhof
Head coach
 Dolf Roks
Technical Director (upper-level A–C)
 Pieter Schrassert Bert
Technical Director (mid-level A–C)
 Camiel van Hoogstraten
Technical Director (lower-level D–F)
 Jim Camphens

See also
 Ajax Youth Academy
 Feyenoord Academy (Varkenoord)

References

External links
Sparta Jeugdopleiding Official site

Youth
Football academies in the Netherlands